Akhmed Zavgaev (ru)
 Andrey Zavityukhin (ru)
 Vitaly Zavraysky (ru)
 Andrey Zavyalkin (ru)
 Amir Zagaev (ru)
 Zagid Zagidov (ru)
 Igor Zadorozhny (ru)
 Aleksandr Zazhigaev (ru)
 Anatoly Zaytsev (ru)
 Andrey Zaytsev (ru)
 Igor Zakirov (ru)
 Ilfat Zakirov (ru)
 Sergey Zalyotin
 Valery Zamaraev (ru)
 Grigory Zamyshlyak (ru)
 Albert Zaripov (ru)
 Vladimir Zakharov (ru)
 Pyotr Zakharov (ru)
 Andrey Zakharchuk (ru)
 Pyotr Zakharchuk (ru)
 Andrey Zvyagintsev (ru)
 Andrey Zelenko (ru)
 Yevgeny Zelenov (ru)
 Aleksandr Zenin (ru)
 Yevgeny Zinichev
 Nikolai Zlobin (ru)
 Oleg Zobov (ru)
 Vladimir Zhoga (ru)
 Andrey Zozulya (ru)
 Yevgeny Zolotukhin (ru)
 Viktor Zubov (ru)
 Denis Zuev (ru)
 Sergey Zyablov (ru)
 Badma Zhabon (ru)
 Vitaly Zhalnin (ru)
 Aleksey Zharov (ru)
 Sergey Zheleznov (ru)
 Gennady Zhidko
 Dmitry Zhidkov (ru)
 Zhantas Zholdinov (ru)
 Sergey Zhuykov (ru)
 Aleksandr Zhukov (ru)
 Aleksandr Zhuravlyov
 Aleksey Zhuravlyov (ru)

References 

 

Heroes Z